The McIntosh Cliffs are a line of steep, uneven, volcanic bluffs or cliffs,  long, forming the southwest side of the Minna Bluff peninsula, at the northeast end of Hillary Coast, Ross Dependency, Antarctica. They were named by the Advisory Committee on Antarctic Names in 1999 after William C. McIntosh of the Department of Geoscience, New Mexico Institute of Mining and Technology (NMIMT), Socorro, a member of the 1982 NMIMT field party that carried out the first geological mapping of Minna Bluff. McIntosh did additional field work at Mount Erebus, 1977–78, 1984–85; Mount Discovery and Mason Spur, 1983–84; Mount Murphy, 1985; the Executive Committee Range, 1989–90; and the Crary Mountains, 1992–93.

References

Cliffs of the Ross Dependency
Hillary Coast